The Gyeongbu Expressway (Gyeongbu Gosokdoro) (Asian Highway Network ) is the second oldest and most heavily travelled expressway in South Korea, connecting Seoul to Suwon, Daejeon, Gumi, Daegu, Gyeongju, Ulsan and Busan. It has the route number 1, signifying its role as South Korea's most important expressway.

History 
 February 1968 - Construction begins at the behest of South Korean President Park Chung-hee, who named Park Myung-keun in charge of construction.
 21 December 1968 - Seoul-Suwon segment opens to traffic.
 30 December 1968 - Suwon-Osan segment opens to traffic.
 29 September 1969 - Osan-Cheonan segment opens to traffic.
 10 December 1969 - Cheonan-Daejeon segment opens to traffic.
 19 December 1969 - Busan-Daegu (via Gyeongju) segment opens to traffic.
 7 July 1970 - The last segment, the mountainous Daejeon-Daegu segment, opens to traffic, completing South Korea's first long-distance limited access expressway.
 December 1987 - Work begins to widen to six lanes in selected areas. Some areas are widened to 8 or 10 lanes by 1996.
 February 1995 - Bus-only lane (essentially an HOV-9) established between the northern terminus and Sintanjin for important holidays.
 14 July 2000 - Eight vehicles, including three buses and a five-ton truck, collide near Gimcheon, killing 18 and injuring over 100.
 25 August 2001 - All expressways in South Korea reorganize under a pattern modeled after the United States' Interstate Highway System. The Gyeongbu Expressway's route number of 1 is the only one not to change; however, its kilometer markers change from a north–south progression to south–north.
 December 2002 - Korea National Expressway Corporation passes control of the northernmost 9 km stretch of expressway (between Yangjae and Hannam Bridge) to the City of Seoul.
 1 July 2008 - Bus lane enforcement between Seoul and Osan (Sintanjin on weekends) becomes daily between 6 AM and 10 PM. On 1 October this is adjusted to 7 AM to 9 PM weekdays, 9 AM to 9 PM weekends.

Compositions

Speed limit 
 Cheonan JC ~ Yangjae IC : 110 km/h
 Guseo IC ~ Cheonan JC : 100 km/h

List of facilities 

 IC: Interchange, JC: Junction, SA: Service Area, TG: Tollgate

Gyeongbu Urban Expressway 

In the past, this section was a part of Gyeongbu Expressway, but in 2002 the Seoul Metropolitan Government has takes control of this segment from Korea Expressway Corporation. As a results, this expressway became a part of Seoul Special Metropolitan Route 06. However, the name remains the same, on Traffic Broadcasting System, it is still called Gyeongbu Expressway or the name "Sigugan", and this section is also designated as Asian Highway 1.

Main stopovers 
 Seoul
 Seocho District - Gangnam District

Speed limit 
 Maximum 80 km/h
 Minimum: 50 km/h

See also 
Roads and expressways in South Korea
Transport in South Korea

References

External links
 MOLIT South Korean Government Transport Department

 
Expressways in South Korea
Roads in Busan
Roads in South Gyeongsang
Roads in Ulsan
Roads in North Gyeongsang
Roads in Daegu
Roads in North Chungcheong
Roads in Daejeon
Roads in South Chungcheong
Roads in Gyeonggi
Roads in Seoul